Sandra M. Gilbert (born December 27, 1936) is an American literary critic and poet who has published in the fields of feminist literary criticism, feminist theory, and psychoanalytic criticism. She is best known for her collaborative critical work with Susan Gubar, with whom she co-authored, among other works, The Madwoman in the Attic (1979). Madwoman in the Attic is widely recognized as a text central to second-wave feminism. She is Professor Emerita of English at the University of California, Davis.

She lives in Berkeley, California, and lived, until 2008, in Paris, France. Her husband, Elliot L. Gilbert, was chair of the Department of English at University of California, Davis, until his death in 1991. She also had a long-term relationship with David Gale, mathematician at University of California, Berkeley, until his death in 2008.

Academia 

Gilbert received her B.A. from Cornell University, her M.A. from New York University, and her Ph.D. in English literature from Columbia University in 1968. She has taught at California State University, Hayward, Williams College, Johns Hopkins University, Stanford University, and Indiana University. She held the C. Barnwell Straut Chair of English at Princeton University from 1985 until 1989.

According to reports in The New York Times, Gilbert, along with Emory Elliott, Valerie Smith, and Margaret Doody all resigned from Princeton in 1989. The reports suggest that the four were unhappy with the leniency shown to Thomas McFarland after he was accused of sexual misconduct. McFarland was initially put on a one-year suspension, but eventually took early retirement after these resignations and threats of student boycotts.

She was named the inaugural M. H. Abrams Distinguished Visiting Professor at Cornell University for spring 2007, and the Lurie Distinguished Visiting Professor in the Creative Writing MFA program at San Jose State University in 2009.

Awards 

Gilbert was president of the Modern Language Association in 1996. She has been a recipient of Guggenheim, Rockefeller, NEH, and Soros Foundation fellowships and has held residencies at Yaddo, MacDowell, Bellagio, Camargo, and Bogliasco. In 1988 she was awarded a D. Litt. by Wesleyan University. In 1990 she was a co-recipient (with Karl Shapiro) of the International Poetry Forum's Charity Randall Award. More recently, she has won a Patterson Prize (for Ghost Volcano), an American Book Award (for Kissing the Bread), the John Ciardi Award for Lifetime Achievement in Poetry (from the Italian-American Foundation), the Premio Lerici Pea awarded by the Liguri nel Mondo association, and several awards from Poetry magazine. In 2004 she was awarded the degree of Doctor Philosophiae Honoris Causa by the Hebrew University of Jerusalem. In 2012, she and her longtime collaborator Susan Gubar were awarded the Ivan Sandrof Lifetime Achievement Award of the National Book Critics Circle. In 2017 she received the honorary degree of Doctor of Laws from Harvard University.

Collaboration with Susan Gubar 

Gilbert and Gubar met in the early 1970s at Indiana University. In 1974, they collaborated to co-teach a course on literature in English by women; their lectures led to the manuscript for Madwoman in the Attic. They have continued to co-author and co-edit, and have been jointly awarded several academic distinctions. Notably, they were jointly named Ms. magazine's "Woman of the Year" in 1986 for their work as head editors of The Norton Anthology of Literature by Women: The Traditions in English.

Because of the success of their joint publications, Gilbert and Gubar are often cited together in the fields of Feminist literary criticism and Feminist theory.

Feminist literary criticism and theory 

Gilbert's critical and theoretical works, particularly those co-authored with Susan Gubar, are generally identified as texts within the realm of second-wave feminism. As such, they represent part of a concerted effort to move beyond the simple assimilationist theories of first-wave feminism, either by rejecting entirely the given, oppressive, patriarchal, male-dominated order of society, or by seeking to reform that order. Gilbert's texts, in turn, lay themselves open to many of the criticisms levelled by third-wave feminism, or thinkers who regard patriarchy not as an integrated and foundational system, but a set of repeated practices which may vary over time and space.

Gilbert is often said to have found her theoretical roots in the earlier 1970s works of Ellen Moers and Elaine Showalter, as the basic premise of her thought is that women writers share a set of similar experiences and that male oppression or patriarchy is everywhere essentially the same.

"The Anxiety of Authorship" 

In The Madwoman in the Attic, Gilbert and Gubar take the Oedipal model of the anxiety of influence developed by literary critic Harold Bloom, centred around writers' Oedipal fear and jealousy for their perceived literary "fore-fathers", and adapt it to their own purposes as feminist critics. According to Bloom's theory, the developing writer must struggle to break free from his most immediate, direct influences, to form his own voice, and to break away from identification to find his own imaginative space. Gilbert and Gubar extend this male-oriented model to incorporate a female "Anxiety of Authorship", whereby lack of predecessors makes the very act of writing problematic.

Where Bloom wonders how the male author can find a voice that is his own, Gilbert and Gubar – building on Virginia Woolf's analysis of the "difficulty...that they had no tradition behind them" – emphasise the problem a woman writer may have in seeing herself as possessing a literary voice at all, given the absence of a maternal precursor. Where Bloom finds aggression and competition between male literary figures in terms of self-consciously feeling influenced and desiring to be influential, the "anxiety of authorship" identifies a "secret sisterhood" of role models within the Western tradition who show that women can write, the recuperation of the tradition of which becomes a feminist project. However, these models too may be "infected" with a lack of confidence, and with internal contradiction of ambition, hampered by the culturally induced assumption of "the patriarchal authority of art."

In later works, the pair explore "the 'double bind' of the woman poet...the contradictions between her vocation and her gender" (Shakespeare's Sisters), as well as the development (in the wake of Sylvia Plath) of a new genre of 'mother poets'.

Critical works 
 
 Acts of Attention: The Poems of D.H. Lawrence (Cornell University Press, 1972)

Co-authored with Susan Gubar 

 A Guide to The Norton Anthology of Literature by Women: The Tradition in English (W.W. Norton, 1985; revised second edition 1996)
 The War of the Words, Volume I of No Man's Land: The Place of the Woman Writer in the Twentieth Century (Yale University Press, 1988)
 Sexchanges, Volume II of No Man's Land: The Place of the Woman Writer in the Twentieth Century (Yale University Press, 1989)
 Letters from the Front, Volume III of No Man's Land: The Place of the Woman Writer in the Twentieth Century (Yale University Press, 1994)
 Masterpiece Theatre: An Academic Melodrama (Rutgers University Press, 1995)
 The Madwoman in the Attic: The Woman Writer and the Nineteenth-Century Literary Imagination (Yale University Press, 1979

Poetry 

 In the Fourth World (University of Alabama Press, 1979)
 The Summer Kitchen (Heyeck Press, 1983)
 Emily's Bread (W. W. Norton, 1984)
 Blood Pressure (W. W. Norton, 1989)
 Ghost Volcano (W. W. Norton, 1997)
 Kissing the Bread: New and Selected Poems 1969-1999 (W. W. Norton, 2000)
 The Italian Collection (Depot Books, 2003)
 Belongings (W. W. Norton, 2006)
 Aftermath: Poems (W. W. Norton, 2011)

Non-fiction 
 Wrongful Death: A Medical Tragedy (W. W. Norton, 1995)
 Death's Door: Modern Dying and The Ways We Grieve (W. W. Norton, 2006)
 Rereading Women: Thirty Years of Exploring Our Literary Traditions (W. W. Norton, 2011)
 The Culinary Imagination: From Myth to Modernity (W. W. Norton, 2014)

Other publications 

Gilbert has edited a collection of elegies:
 Inventions of Farewell (W. W. Norton, 2001)

With Susan Gubar, she has edited several collections:
 Shakespeare's Sisters: Feminist Essays on Women Poets (Indiana University Press, 1981)
 The Norton Anthology of Literature by Women: The Traditions in English (W.W. Norton, 1985, 1990, 1996, 2007)
 Women Poets, Special Double Issue of Women's Studies (1980)
 The Female Imagination and the Modernist Aesthetic (Gordon and Breach, 1986)

With Susan Gubar and Diana O'Hehir, she has edited a collection of poetry:
 MotherSongs: Poetry by, for, and about Mothers (W.W. Norton, 1995)

With Wendy Barker, she has edited a collection of essays on the work of Ruth Stone:
 The House is Made of Poetry (Southern Illinois University Press, 1996)

Notes

References 
 The Dictionary of Literary Biography, vol. 120, ed. R.S. Gwynn (1992)
 UCDavis Academic Profile
 The Norton Anthology of Literary Criticism, ed. Vincent B. Leitch et al. (New York: W. W. Norton, 2001)
 Making Feminist History: The Literary Scholarship of Sandra M. Gilbert and Susan Gubar, ed. William E. Cain (1994)
 Toril Moi, Sexual/Textual Politics (1985)
 "Interview with Sandra M. Gilbert and Susan Gubar", Critical Texts 6.1, Elizabeth Rosdeitcher (1989)
 "Literary critic Sandra Gilbert named M.H. Abrams Distinguished Visiting Professor", Cornell Chronicle (17 October 2006)

External links 
 Gilbert's personal webpage
 UCDavis academic profile
 Indiana University's academic profile of Susan Gubar

American academics of English literature
American literary critics
Women literary critics
Wesleyan University people
Cornell University alumni
New York University alumni
Columbia Graduate School of Arts and Sciences alumni
Cornell University faculty
Williams College faculty
Stanford University Department of English faculty
Johns Hopkins University faculty
San Jose State University faculty
Princeton University faculty
Indiana University faculty
1936 births
Living people
University of California, Davis faculty
California State University, East Bay faculty
American feminist writers
Postmodern feminists
American writers of Italian descent
American Book Award winners
Members of the American Philosophical Society
American women critics
Presidents of the Modern Language Association